The spinels are any of a class of minerals of general formulation  which crystallise in the cubic (isometric) crystal system, with the X anions (typically chalcogens, like oxygen and sulfur) arranged in a cubic close-packed lattice and the cations A and B occupying some or all of the octahedral and tetrahedral sites in the lattice. Although the charges of A and B in the prototypical spinel structure are +2 and +3, respectively, other combinations incorporating divalent, trivalent, or tetravalent cations, including magnesium, zinc, iron, manganese, aluminium, chromium, titanium, and silicon, are also possible. The anion is normally oxygen; when other chalcogenides constitute the anion sublattice the structure is referred to as a thiospinel.

A and B can also be the same metal with different valences, as is the case with magnetite,  (as ), which is the most abundant member of the spinel group. Spinels are grouped in series by the B cation.

The group is named for spinel, which was once known as "spinel ruby". (Today the term ruby is used only for corundum.)

Spinel group members
Members of the spinel group include:
Aluminium spinels:
Spinel: , after which this class of minerals is named
Gahnite: 
Hercynite: 
Galaxite: 
Pleonaste: 
Iron spinels:
Cuprospinel: 
Franklinite: 
Jacobsite: 
Magnesioferrite: 
Magnetite: , where one Fe is +2 and two Fe's are +3, respectively.
Trevorite: 
Ulvöspinel: 
Zinc ferrite: 
Chromium spinels:
Chromite: 
Magnesiochromite: 
Zincochromite: 
Cobalt spinels:
Manganesecobaltite: 
Vanadium spinels:
Coulsonite: 
Magnesiocoulsonite: 
Others with the spinel structure:
Ringwoodite: , an abundant olivine polymorph within the Earth's mantle from about 520 to 660 km depth, and a rare mineral in meteorites
 Taaffeite:  with an empirical formula as a spinel, but the chemical formula is four times as large.
 Musgravite:   a type of "multi-spinel".

There are many more compounds with a spinel structure, e.g. the thiospinels and selenospinels, that can be synthesized in the lab or in some cases occur as minerals.

The heterogeneity of spinel group members varies based on composition with ferrous and magnesium based members varying greatly as in solid solution, which requires similarly sized cations. However, ferric and aluminium based spinels are almost entirely homogeneous due to their large size difference.

The spinel structure

The space group for a spinel group mineral may be Fdm (the same as for diamond), but in some cases (such as spinel itself, beyond 452.6 K) it is actually the tetrahedral F3m.

Normal spinel structures are usually cubic close-packed oxides with eight tetrahedral and four octahedral sites per formula unit. The tetrahedral spaces are smaller than the octahedral spaces. B ions occupy half the octahedral holes, while A ions occupy one-eighth of the tetrahedral holes. The mineral spinel  has a normal spinel structure.

In a normal spinel structure, the ions are in the following positions (where i, j, and k are arbitrary integers and δ, ε, and ζ are small real numbers):

 X:
 (1/4-δ,   δ,     δ  ) + ((i+j)/2, (j+k)/2, (i+k)/2)
 ( δ,     1/4-δ,  δ  ) + ((i+j)/2, (j+k)/2, (i+k)/2)
 ( δ,      δ,   1/4-δ) + ((i+j)/2, (j+k)/2, (i+k)/2)
 (1/4-δ, 1/4-δ, 1/4-δ) + ((i+j)/2, (j+k)/2, (i+k)/2)
 (3/4+ε, 1/2-ε, 1/2-ε) + ((i+j)/2, (j+k)/2, (i+k)/2)
 (1-ε,   1/4+ε, 1/2-ε) + ((i+j)/2, (j+k)/2, (i+k)/2)
 (1-ε,   1/2-ε, 1/4+ε) + ((i+j)/2, (j+k)/2, (i+k)/2)
 (3/4+ε, 1/4+ε, 1/4+ε) + ((i+j)/2, (j+k)/2, (i+k)/2)
 A:
 (1/8, 1/8, 1/8) + ((i+j)/2, (j+k)/2, (i+k)/2)
 (7/8, 3/8, 3/8) + ((i+j)/2, (j+k)/2, (i+k)/2)
 B:
 (1/2+ζ,   ζ,     ζ  ) + ((i+j)/2, (j+k)/2, (i+k)/2)
 (1/2+ζ, 1/4-ζ, 1/4-ζ) + ((i+j)/2, (j+k)/2, (i+k)/2)
 (3/4-ζ, 1/4-ζ,   ζ  ) + ((i+j)/2, (j+k)/2, (i+k)/2)
 (3/4-ζ,   ζ,   1/4-ζ) + ((i+j)/2, (j+k)/2, (i+k)/2)

The first four X positions form a tetrahedron around the first A position, and the last four form one around the second A position. When the space group is Fdm then δ=ε and ζ=0. In this case, a three-fold improper rotation with axis in the 111 direction is centred on the point (0, 0, 0) (where there is no ion) and can also be centred on the B ion at (1/2, 1/2, 1/2), and in fact every B ion is the centre of an improper three-fold rotation. Under this space group the two A positions are equivalent. If the space group is F3m then the improper three-fold rotations become proper three-fold rotations because the inversion disappears, and the two A positions are no longer equivalent.

Every ion is on at least three mirror planes and at least one three-fold rotation axis. The structure has tetrahedral symmetry around each A ion, and the A ions are arranged just like the carbon atoms in diamond.

Inverse spinel structures have a different cation distribution in that all of the A cations and half of the B cations occupy octahedral sites, while the other half of the B cations occupy tetrahedral sites.

In addition, intermediate cases exist where the cation distribution can be described as (A1−xBx)[AB1−]2O4, where parentheses and brackets [] are used to denote tetrahedral and octahedral sites, respectively. The so-called inversion degree, x, adopts values between 0 (normal) and 1 (inverse), 

The cation distribution in spinel structures are related to the crystal field stabilization energies (CFSE) of the constituent transition metals. Some ions may have a distinct preference for the octahedral site depending on the d-electron count. If the A2+ ions have a strong preference for the octahedral site, they will displace half of the B3+ ions from the octahedral sites to tetrahedral sites. Similarly, if the B3+ ions have a low or zero octahedral site stabilization energy (OSSE), then they will occupy tetrahedral sites, leaving octahedral sites for the A2+ ions.

Burdett and co-workers proposed an alternative treatment of the problem of spinel inversion, using the relative sizes of the s and p atomic orbitals of the two types of atom to determine their site preferences. This is because the dominant stabilizing interaction in the solids is not the crystal field stabilization energy generated by the interaction of the ligands with the d electrons, but the σ-type interactions between the metal cations and the oxide anions. This rationale can explain anomalies in the spinel structures that crystal-field theory cannot, such as the marked preference of Al3+ cations for octahedral sites or of Zn2+ for tetrahedral sites, which crystal field theory would predict neither has a site preference. Only in cases where this size-based approach indicates no preference for one structure over another do crystal field effects make any difference; in effect they are just a small perturbation that can sometimes affect the relative preferences, but which often do not.

Common uses in industry and technology 
Spinels commonly form in high temperature processes. Either native oxide scales of metals, or intentional deposition of spinel coatings can be used to protect base metals from oxidation or corrosion. The presence of spinels may hereby serve as thin (few micrometer thick) functional layers, that prevent the diffusion of oxygen (or other atmospheric) ions or specific metal ions such as chromium, which otherwise exhibits a fast diffusion process at high temperatures.

Further reading

References